Mukunda Ram Choudhary (born 1 April 1949) is an Indian politician who was the member of the 13th Assam Legislative Assembly for Kalaigaon Assembly constituency (no. 65) in Udalguri district from 2011 to 2016.

References

1949 births
Asom Gana Parishad politicians
Assam MLAs 2011–2016
Living people
People from Udalguri district